Kalkaska Public Schools is a school district headquartered in Kalkaska, Michigan.

History 
In 1993, the school district gained national attention when it ended the 1992–93 school year in March due to bankruptcy.

Schools

High school (9-12)

 Kalkaska High School

Middle school (6-8)

 Kalkaska Middle School

Primary schools

 Birch Street Elementary School (PreK-3)
 Cherry Street Intermediate School (4-5)
 Rapid City Elementary School (PreK-5)

References

External links

 Articles about Kalkaska Public Schools - The Review (Bellaire, Michigan)
Education in Kalkaska County, Michigan
School districts in Michigan